Robert Paul Jaques (born November 2, 1956) is a Canadian-American animator and animation director. He is best known for the television series The Ren and Stimpy Show, Ren and Stimpy "Adult Party Cartoon", and SpongeBob SquarePants. He also was nominated for two Emmys in 1992 and 1993 for his contributions to The Ren and Stimpy Show.

Early life and career
Jaques' fascination with animation began by watching the Fleischer Popeye cartoons as a kid, and he never thought of animating as a profession. He also did some stop motion animations since he was a fan of Ray Harryhausen films. One day, he got sick with mononucleosis and did nothing but watch cartoons. Jaques didn't "draw religiously" like other children his age but he was basically self taught. He got curious in traditional animation when he was older and applied for a animation course in Sheridan College which didn't work the first time but when he drew with more effort it worked the second time. At Sheridan, he met with John Kricfalusi and Jaques showed 16mm prints during lunch hours of shorts from the Golden age of American animation, which a crowd of people would come in and John would be one of the regulars. Kricfalusi saw one of Jaques animated shorts, which was based on a Robert Crumb comic called Tales from the Land of Genitalia, in which Jaques animated a penis with arms and legs jerking itself off, and Kricfalusi, when he saw the short, immediately thought he could animate.  Eventually, Kricfalusi and Jaques became great friends because they both had an interest in golden age cartoons.

Jaques animation career started at Nelvana in the 1970s as an assistant animator for Jeff Short, an employee for the Richard Williams Studio. It didn't last long since Short got frustrated at the Nelvana animation process, so Jaques switched over the Nelvana commercial department with Mark Mayerson. He headed to Los Angeles in 1981, and his first job there was working for the show Laverne and Shirley in the Army. His first work with Kricfalusi was a animation director for the Harlem Shuffle music video, which was animated at Bagdasarian Productions and was part of a pitch piece presented by Ralph Bakshi and drawn by Kricfalusi. Ralph made a deal with The Rolling Stones to make the video for the single. In 1989, Kricfalusi called Jaques and told him he sold the pilot to Ren and Stimpy, and the characters were from his Your Gang concept, and Kricfalusi asked him to work on the pilot, to which he said yes. Him and Kelly Armstrong worked on the pilot in Vancouver, and Jaques sent pencil tests to Spümcø for approval. He went on to work for the show in general.

He is currently the host of the Cartoon Logic podcast with Thad Komorowski.

Filmography

Film

Television

Notes

References

External links 

Animation directors
Canadian animators
Living people
Sheridan College animation program alumni
1956 births
Historians of animation